Indirect speech, also known as reported speech, indirect discourse (US), or  ( or ), is the practice, common in all Latin historical writers, of reporting spoken or written words indirectly, using different grammatical forms. Passages of indirect speech can extend from a single phrase to an entire paragraph, and this style was generally preferred by Roman historians to the direct speech commonly found in Greek authors.

The main types of indirect speech in Latin are indirect statements, indirect commands, and indirect questions. Indirect statements in classical Latin usually use the accusative and infinitive construction. In this the main verb of the quoted sentence is changed to an infinitive, and its subject to the accusative case; this construction is also sometimes used for commands and rhetorical questions.

Indirect questions, most indirect commands, and most subordinate verbs in indirect statements use the subjunctive mood. Subjunctive mood tenses are divided into two groups, primary (present and perfect) and historic (imperfect and pluperfect).

Although the term  strictly speaking refers to the reporting of spoken or written words, the same grammatical constructions are also used in sentences introduced by other verbs such as those of perceiving, showing, remembering, and thinking. These are also included in this article.

Main types of indirect speech

Indirect statement
The most common type of indirect speech is indirect statement, for which in classical Latin (although not in medieval Latin) the usual grammatical form is the accusative and infinitive construction. In this the subject of the quoted sentence is put into the accusative case, and the verb is changed to an infinitive.

The present infinitive is used when the original verb was a present indicative tense:

 (Caesar)
'it was reported that Scipio was nearby'

The perfect infinitive is used when the original verb was a perfect, imperfect, or pluperfect indicative tense:

 (Servius Sulpicius Rufus)
'he reported to me that Marcus Marcellus had received two wounds'

 (Cicero)
'I heard that Valerius was due to arrive today'

The verb  'I am able' on the other hand has no future infinitive or future participle.

 (Cicero)
'(he said that) if he had not been tired from the journey, he would have come to us straightaway'

However, these are rare.

The main verb introducing indirect statements does not have to be a verb of speaking; it can also be any of a range of other verbs, such as  'he realised',  'he pretended',  'it is well known',  'I hope',  'he wrote' and so on, which use the same construction.

The infinitive is used only for the main verb in an indirect statement; any other verbs are changed into the subjunctive mood, using one of the past tenses if the context is past:

 (Nepos)
'(he told them that) they would easily find the place where he was'

Indirect question
Another kind of indirect speech is the indirect question, in which the verb is usually changed into the subjunctive mood:

 (Catullus)
'do you ask why I do this, perhaps?'

When the context is past, one of the past tenses of the subjunctive is used (imperfect or pluperfect). (There are some exceptions to this rule, however.)

 (Cicero)
'I told them what he had done that night'

Indirect command
The third main type of indirect speech is the indirect command, for which two constructions are possible. Some verbs, principally the verb  'I order' and its opposite  'I forbid', use the accusative and infinitive construction, often with a passive infinitive:

 (Caesar)
'he ordered the signal to be given'

Most other verbs use a clause introduced by the conjunction  or (if negative)  followed by a subjunctive verb. As with indirect questions, the tense of the subjunctive depends on whether the context is present or past. A present context requires the present subjunctive:

 (Cicero)
'he is encouraging me to write to the Senate'

A past context usually (but not always) has the imperfect subjunctive:

 (Caesar)
'he ordered the army not to start fighting without his permission'

Change of person
Another of the characteristics of indirect speech is that the pronouns and persons of the verb change in accordance to the viewpoint of the new speaker. Thus in the following example, the original thought was 'he is very grateful to you'. In indirect speech this becomes:

 (Cicero)
'he wrote to me that you were very grateful to me'

Very often the viewpoint changes to the 3rd person, in which case the reflexive pronoun  (or ) 'himself, herself, themselves' and its various derivatives  etc. are used in order to refer to the speaker of the reported words:

 (Nepos)
'he ordered this man to follow him'

 (Nepos)
'he replied that he did not know Aristides personally'

When the subject of the verb of speaking is feminine or plural,  will be translated as 'she' or 'they':

 (Gellius)
'his wife said that she wished to bathe in the men's baths'

 (Pliny the Younger)
'they said they had been cheated'

The reflexive pronoun  can sometimes be used to refer to the speaker even when the speaker is not strictly the grammatical subject of the sentence, as in this example:

 (Cicero)
'I am being invited by Caesar to be one of his deputy commanders'

To avoid ambiguity in English, it is often necessary to insert a name:

 (Cicero)
'he (Africanus) said that he knew that Licinius had been lying when he took the oath'

However,  and  can be ambiguous, since in addition to referring to the speaker, they can also refer reflexively to the subject of the nearest verb. Thus in these two indirect questions, the word  refers to Caesar (the subject of ) but  'his' refers to the speaker, Ariovistus:

 (Caesar) 
'what did Caesar want for himself? why was he entering Ariovistus's territory?'

Similarly, in the following example,  and  refer to the Roman ambassadors (the subject of ), while  refers to the king (the subject of ):

 (Nepos)
'they sent ambassadors to Bithynia, who were to request the king that he should not keep their greatest enemy with him, but hand him over to them'

Indirect statements

Constructions with the infinitive

Verbs of speaking
Often in historical writing there is no verb of speaking but it is implied by the context and by the use of the accusative and infinitive construction:

 (Livy)
'she sent a messenger to say that they should come: a terrible thing had happened'

 (Caesar)
'they sent ambassadors to Caesar: (they declared that) they were prepared to open the gates...'

A future tense in indirect speech is turned into a future participle + . The infinitive  is very often omitted:

 (Livy)
'they replied that they would follow the dictator'

A pronoun is usually used for the subject of an infinitive, even if it is omitted in direct speech. However, in some cases, when the pronoun is easily understood from the context, it can be dropped:

 (Caesar)
'he found out that (those things) were true'

When the verb is impersonal, such as  'it seems' or  'it is fitting', there is no subject:

 (Servius)
'(he told me that) it was hoped, however, that he would be able to live'

When the infinitive  is combined with a future or perfect participle, a gerundive, or an adjective,  is sometimes omitted:

 (Caesar)
'Lucius Piso, the Censor, promised that he would go to Caesar'

The accusative and infinitive is also used for expressing what someone shows or pretends to be the case:

 (Caesar)
'he pretended that he was setting off to see Caesar'

Verbs of perception
An accusative and infinitive can also be used to express a piece of information which someone has been told, or by extension which someone has learnt about, noticed, realised, seen, dreamed of, perceived or simply knows:

 ([Caesar])
'they learnt that Caesar himself had come in the fleet'

 (Livy)
'he realised that the plot had been betrayed.'

 (Nepos)
'he foresaw that he was going to be in great danger, unless he took some precautions'

Verbs of perception such as  'I see' and  'I find' can also be followed by a present participle (without ). In the following example, the two constructions are shown side by side:

 (Livy)
'looking back, he saw them following at wide intervals, and that one of them was not far away from him'

The accusative and present participle construction can also sometimes be found after verbs such as  'I learn':

 (Nepos)
'but when he arrived in Carthage, he found out that the republic was in a very different state than he had hoped'

Verbs of thinking and feeling
Another reason to use the accusative and infinitive is to express someone's thoughts, such as the reasons for undertaking a certain course of action:

 (Caesar)
'he thought it would be very useful for him, if he could just go to the island'

It can similarly be used with verbs such as  'I am sure',  'I remember', and  'I forget':

 (Cicero)
'I am sure that you are going to do it'

 (Cicero)
'I cannot forget that this country is mine'

Occasionally verbs of emotion such as 'I am glad' or 'I am sorry' can take an accusative and infinitive; although the more usual construction is a -clause:

 (Terence)
'I'm glad you've arrived safely'

Negative statements
When the reported sentence is negative, it is common to use the verb  rather than :

 (Nepos)
'Phocion denied that there was any danger / said there was no danger'

Similarly  is used in preference to :

 (Caesar)
'they do not think it is right to do violence to a guest'

Passive main verb
When the verb of speaking is passive, it can be used either personally ('he is said to have done it') or impersonally ('it is said that he did it'). A present tense such as  'he is said' or  'he seems' is usually used personally:

 (Cicero)
'he is said to have opened a school at Corinth'

When the verb of speaking is used personally, the subject of the reported statement, and hence any participles or nouns agreeing with it, are nominative:
 (Cicero)
'he is said to be planning to come'

 (Cicero)
'it seems that he's about to sail'

 (Cicero)
'he is said to have been a great mathematician'

However, when the verb uses a compound tense such as the perfect passive , it is usually used impersonally, hence with an accusative and infinitive:

 (Cicero)
'it has been reported to us that Caesar is going to stay at Beneventum'

Nominative and infinitive
Sometimes an active verb of speaking can be used with a nominative and infinitive construction, but only in poetry. The word 'claim' is used in the same way in English:

 (Catullus)
'he claims to have been the fastest of boats'

Other indirect statement constructions

 (Curtius)
'nor did they doubt that the king himself had been killed'

The construction with  can also be used after other negative phrases:

 (Caesar)
'nor is the suspicion absent that he planned his own death'

In the following example, however,  is followed by :

 (Pliny the Younger)
'for I am sure that you won't be able to put (the book) down once you have picked it up'

with the indicative
Another way of expressing the English conjunction 'that...' is to use a -clause, with the indicative. This is found whenever the meaning is 'the fact that...'; for example:

 (Cicero)
'that he (Regulus) returned seems marvellous to us'

 is also used after verbs of adding or omitting: 
 (Cicero)
'I pass over the fact that he chose that house for himself'

It is also found after verbs of emotion such as 'I am glad that', 'I am sorry that', 'it turned out well that' and so on:
 (Cicero)
'I'm sorry that you're angry now'

with the subjunctive
In later Latin,  with the subjunctive could substitute for the accusative an infinitive in indirect statement, though this did not become common until the second century AD:
 (De Bello Hispaniensi)
'the ambassadors reported that they had Pompey in their power'

 (Vulgate Bible)
'and God saw that it was good'

and 
In post-classical Latin, the conjunction , which means 'because' in classical Latin, could also be used to introduce an indirect statement. They are usually used with the indicative mood:

 (Vulgate Bible)
'you have heard that it was said to the ancients "thou shalt not kill".'

 (Vulgate Bible)
'we know that his testimony is true'

The conjunction  'since', can also introduce an indirect statement:

 (Vulgate Bible)
'for it is written that Abraham had two sons'

 (Vulgate Bible)
'he denies, (saying) that Jesus is not Christ'

This construction is found even in the classical period in Petronius, who satirises the bad grammar and incorrect speech of lower-class people. The following is from a speech of a freedman called Echion:

 (Petronius)
'I've already killed three of his goldfinches, and I said that a weasel ate them'

Expressions with 
In addition, various expressions such as  'it happened that',  'he brought it about that', etc. are followed by an -clause with the subjunctive.

 (Nepos)
'it happened by chance that some ambassadors of King Prusias were dining in Rome'

 (Nepos)
'he arranged that he should be sent to Spain as commander with an army'

 (De Bello Hispaniensi)
'if only the immortal gods had brought it about that I had become your soldier rather than Gnaeus Pompeius's!'

 (Livy)
'this pardon is given to antiquity that by mixing human and divine it makes the beginnings of cities more grand'

Indirect questions
In the second type of indirect speech, indirect question, the verb is usually changed to the subjunctive mood, although occasionally, in rhetorical questions, the infinitive may be used (see below). When the context is primary, the present or perfect subjunctive is usual:

 (Cicero)
'I don't know why they can't'

 (Cicero) 
'What you were doing, where you were, who you (had) called together, what plans you made, which of us do you think does not know these things?'

The first four the verbs in the last example above are perfect subjunctive, which in an indirect question may represent an imperfect, perfect, or pluperfect tense in the original speech. The last verb  is an infinitive, since it is a rhetorical question resembling a statement ('there is none of us who doesn't know') more than a question.

When the context is historic, the imperfect and pluperfect subjunctives are usual:

 (Cicero)
'then I showed the tablets to Lentulus and asked if he recognised the seal; he nodded.'

 (Cicero)
'I asked Catiline whether he had been at the nighttime meeting at Marcus Laeca's house or not.'

 (Cicero)
'I have absolutely no idea what is going to happen'

A past potential subjunctive in a conditional clause becomes a future participle with the perfect subjunctive of :

 (Livy)
'tell us what you would have done, if you had been censor at that time'

Wh-questions 
Indirect questions which are dependent on a verb of asking in the classical period usually use a subjunctive verb. (The indicative is found in early Latin and sometimes in poetry.) When the context is past, as in the second example below, the tense of the quoted verb is usually changed to past in according with the sequence of tenses rule:

 (Cicero)
'they are asking me where the money is'

 (Cicero)
'he asked where the letter was from'

A question in  does not always have an introductory verb, but can be indicated as being indirect by the use of the subjunctive mood. The following questions come in the middle of a long speech by the Germanic chieftain Ariovistus:

 (Caesar) 
'what did Caesar want for himself? why was he entering Ariovistus's territory?'

Yes-no questions 

 (Nepos)
'he asked me whether I wanted to go with him to the camp'

 (Suetonius)
'he held the money under Titus's nose, asking if he was offended by the smell'

After , the particle  is used, and it is also sometimes used after other verbs (but not in Caesar or Cicero). The phrase  'I don't know whether' means simply 'perhaps':

 (Cicero)
'I now come to what perhaps ought to have been first'

Sometimes an indirect question can begin with  'if'. The usual meaning is 'in order to see if':

 (Caesar)
'the enemy poured round (to see) if they could find any way of getting near'

In Livy  'if' can also mean simply 'whether':

 (Livy)
'he asked if it were possible to serve in the Roman army'

Disjunctive questions 
For 'or not',  is used:

 (Cicero)
'he was deliberating whether he should set out to Rome or make for Capua'

 (Cicero)
'you have no idea whether he was white or black'

 (Cicero)
'as soon as you know whether or not the calendar in Rome has been adjusted, please write to me'

Indirect questions with the infinitive 
Not all questions in  use the subjunctive. A rhetorical question (provided it is not directly dependent on a verb of speaking, and provided that it is not derived from an originally 2nd person verb) is put in the accusative and infinitive construction:

 (Caesar)
'what purpose did all these things have except for his own destruction?'

 (Caesar)
'what was more shameful than to adopt a course of action at the enemy's behest?'

A rhetorical question can also have the accusative and infinitive if it is equivalent to a statement. In the following example, the meaning is 'there is none of us who doesn't know these things':

 (Cicero)
'which of us do you think does not know these things?'

Indirect commands

Using the infinitive
In an indirect command, there are two possible forms. If the verb of speaking is  'I order', the same construction is used as in indirect statement, that is accusative and infinitive:

 (Curtius)
'Perdiccas ordered the boys to mount their horses'

 (Caesar)
'he ordered the centurions to follow him'

A few other verbs, such as  'I allow',  'I forbid', and sometimes  'I order' take the same construction:

 (Martial)
'my friend Paetus forbids me to be sad'

Verbs of will, such as  'I forbid', are always used personally even in the perfect passive tense:

 (Livy)
'the people of Nola were forbidden to approach the walls'

Quite commonly these verbs are used with a passive infinitive:
 (Caesar)
'Caesar ordered the bridge to be torn down'

 (Caesar)
'He ordered the signal to be given and an attack to be made on the enemy'

 (Caesar)
'they do not allow wine to be imported'

 (Cicero)
'no law forbids this to be done / says this may not be done'

 (Suetonius)
'he ordered that Livia should be brought to him'

Using the subjunctive
However, most verbs of ordering, persuading, and encouraging are followed by  'that' or  'that not' and a subjunctive mood verb. This construction is common after verbs such as  'I order',  'I ask',  'I request',  'I advise',  'I persuade',  'I exhort' and others. If the context is past, the imperfect subjunctive is used, otherwise the present:

 (Nepos)
'he ordered him to go round all the doors of the building'

 (Nepos)
'he persuaded the people that a fleet of a hundred ships should be built with that money'

 (Caesar)
'he commanded the army not to join battle without his orders'

 (Caesar)
'he requested to be sent to Caesar'

 (Cicero)
'I advise you not to do it'

 (Cicero)
'I made an edict that no one was to leave without my permission'

 (Nepos)
'Pausanias began to beg him not to tell anyone or to betray him'

 (Nepos)
'he should not keep their greatest enemy with him, but he should surrender him to them'

 (Nepos)
'they themselves should arrest him, if they could'

Verbs of will
The accusative and infinitive construction can be used after verbs of will, such as  'I want' and  'I prefer', but mainly when the person has no power over the action:

 (Horace)
'you want me to weep'

 (Nepos)
'he preferred to be loved than to be feared'

Verbs of will can also take the subjunctive in the same way as an indirect command. With the verb  the conjunction  can be omitted:

 (Cicero)
'I want you to have those compositions'

Wishes, hopes and fears
The sentence which is made indirect can be a wish, e.g. "may it (not) happen!" This is expressed in sentences like those below.

Wishes
The thought that is made indirect can be a wish, e.g. 'may it happen!' or 'if only it had happened!'. If the wish is for something which is impossible, the main verb becomes the imperfect subjunctive , followed by the imperfect or pluperfect subjunctive:

 (Cicero)
'I wish Panaetius could be here'

 (Cicero)
'I wish you had invited me to dinner'

However, if the wish can still be true, the present subjunctive  is used, followed by the present subjunctive:

 (Cicero)
'I wish it had been true about Menedemus; I hope it may be true about the queen'

Hopes
The verb  'I hope' is generally followed by an accusative and infinitive construction.

 (Cicero).
'I hope that that will happen to us'

However, a present or perfect infinitive is also possible:
 (Cicero)
'I hope you are passing a pleasant winter there'

 (Augustus)
'I hope you celebrated my 64th birthday in good health and spirits'

Fears

 (Ovid)
'he became afraid in case by chance the sacred air might burst into flames from so many fires'

For a negative fear,  can be used:
 (Cicero)
'I am afraid that I might not be granted my request'

Another possibility is to use ; 'not' must be added in English:

 (Plautus)
'as for the costume I've lent, I'm afraid I may not be able to get it back!'

Normally a verb of fearing is followed by a fear for a later time, but it can sometimes equally be a fear for something past, in which case it will be followed by a perfect or pluperfect subjunctive:

 (Petronius)
'I was afraid I had let Ascyltos's double into the lodgings'

Tenses in indirect speech

A table of tenses
When a sentence is made indirect, the verbs generally change either to the infinitive or the subjunctive mood. There are fewer tenses in the infinitive than in the indicative, so sometimes the same infinitive tense can be interpreted as a transformation of more than one indicative tense; for example, the perfect infinitive can reflect the perfect, pluperfect, or imperfect indicative. There is also no distinction between the logical future condition ('if this happens') and the ideal future condition ('if this were to happen'). Further details are given in the sections below.

The following table summarises how the tense of the main verb of a quoted sentence changes when it is made indirect:

The categories 'doubly past' and 'future perfect' above are only found with passive and deponent verbs.

Tenses of the infinitive

Contemporaneous situation
A present infinitive in indirect speech usually represents a situation contemporaneous with the introductory verb, whether the main verb is present or past tense. In the following examples, the verb in direct speech would have been present tense (e.g. ):

 (Livy)
'it was announced that the enemy were present.'

 (Nepos)
'he realised that he was being sought'

However, the verb  'I remember', when the sentence describes a personal reminiscence, is an exception to the rule given above, in that the present infinitive is used even though it refers to an event earlier than the introductory verb:

 (Cicero)
'I remember being present'

Earlier event or situation
If the reported sentence describes an event or situation earlier than the introductory verb, the perfect infinitive is used. This applies whether the main verb is in the present tense or one of the past tenses:

 (Cicero)
'Hirtius told me that he had written to him'

 (Servius to Cicero)
'he brought me news that Marcus Marcellus had been stabbed with a dagger and had received two wounds'

 (Servius to Cicero)
'(he said that) he had been sent to me by Marcellus'

 (Livy)
'they say that his head caught fire while many people were watching'

The perfect infinitive can also represent an imperfect indicative in the original sentence. In the following example  is equivalent to the imperfect tense  in direct speech:

 (Nepos)
'it is said that at that time the mother of Pausanias was still living'

In the following example, to emphasise the idea of habitual action, a frequentative verb  'I do often' is used:

 (Ammianus)
'which is something that we read Alexander the Great frequently used to do'

If the infinitive is passive (e.g. ), the auxiliary verb  can sometimes be omitted:

 (Seneca)
'he heard that his brother had been killed'

 (Ammianus)
'it was reported that Constantinople had been shaken by an earthquake'

Perfect participle with 

Occasionally a perfect passive infinitive is found formed with  instead of the usual . This usually refers to a situation that existed at a certain time in the past resulting from an earlier event:

 (Asconius)
'it appears from the speech that while the trial was in progress, an army had been stationed in the forum by Gnaeus Pompeius'

 (Plautus)
'are you saying that (at the time when you saw me) I was wearing (lit. was dressed in) a lady's mantle?'

 (Cicero)
'it is sufficient to show that (at the time Clodius was murdered) great hope had been placed for him in Milo's death'

In other examples the participle refers to a situation that existed up until a certain time in the past, but which changed later:

 (Ovid)
'Zancle (= Messina in Sicily) too is said to have been formerly joined to Italy, until the sea took away the common boundary'

 (Cicero)
'I found out that (until you got to know him better) he had previously been unfairly suspected by you'

 (Livy)
'Tanaquil addressed the people: she said that the king had been knocked unconscious by the sudden blow, but he had now recovered'

For further examples see Latin tenses#Perfect infinitive with fuisse.

Later event or situation
If an indirect statement describes an event or situation later than the introductory verb, the future infinitive is used. This consists of the future participle + , if active, or the supine +  if passive. The future participle is an adjective, and so changes for number and gender:
 
 (Cicero)
'and they said that they were going to send a letter to you'

The infinitive  is often omitted:

 (Cicero)
'he ordered a message to be taken to me that he was going to come soon'

Since the supine is a verbal noun, the ending -um does not change with gender or number:

 (Terence)
'a rumour comes that a gladiatorial show is going to be given'

 (Cicero)
'I think that the business will be completed before his return'

The verb  has its own future infinitive , equivalent to :

 (Cicero)
'I don't think there will be an election'

 (Caesar)
'in the letter he wrote that he had set out with the legions and would soon be there'

 can also be used in the phrase  (occasionally  or ) followed by a present or imperfect subjunctive to report a future event. This can be used with an active or a passive verb:

 (Tacitus)
'the astrologers replied that (Nero) would become Emperor, and that he would kill his mother'

 (Cicero)
'they all thought that the poor man was going to be beaten with the rods'

 (Cicero)
'the voice said that, unless some precaution was taken, Rome would be captured'

The participle  can be used alone without :

 (Nepos)
(he said that) it they did this energetically, the enemy would not be able to resist'

The verb  has no future infinitive, but the infinitive  can sometimes refer to a future time relative to the main verb.

 (Cicero)
'he hopes it is going to be possible for him to leave for Italy with me'

In indirect commands and after verbs of will, the simple present infinitive has a future meaning. Thus in the first of the sentences below, the future infinitive is used in an accusative and infinitive construction, but in the second, the simple present infinitive is used with no accusative:

 (Caesar)
'Lucius Lentulus the consul promised that he would not fail the Republic'

 (Caesar)
'(he said that) Pompey was determined not to fail the Republic'

Future perfect situation
If the main verb of a reported statement is a reflection of a future perfect tense in direct speech, it cannot be expressed using an active verb, but it is possible to use a passive or deponent perfect participle with :

 (Livy)
'the Carthaginians thought that the war would soon be ended.'

 (Cicero)
'(philosophers say that) if someone removed fear, all carefulness of life would have been removed too'

 (Cicero)
'I can say this, that I will have achieved enough, if no danger redounds on me.'

Very rarely a future perfect of direct speech can be represented in an indirect statement by  followed by a perfect or pluperfect subjunctive:

 (Cicero)
'I was hoping that by the time you received this letter, the requests which I requested from you in my earlier letter would have been granted' (Epistolary imperfect = 'I hope that...')

As the last two examples above illustrate, in a subordinate clause in  the future perfect tense usually becomes either the perfect subjunctive or pluperfect subjunctive, according to whether the tense of the introductory verb is primary or historic. In a few cases, however, when the introductory verb is in the 1st or 2nd person, the future perfect indicative is retained.

Ideal potential situations

The distinction between the ideal conditional ('if this were to happen') and the simple future conditional ('if this happens') disappears in indirect speech). Thus in an indirect statement, the future participle is used, just as with a future logical conditional:

 (Cicero)
'he says that if he were being burnt, he would say "how pleasant this is!"'

 (Curtius)
'(he had written that) a person would inevitably grow old just visiting such a huge country, even without fighting a battle'

Present unreal situations
If a reported statement depends on a situation contrary to fact, the verb takes the form of a future participle + , which is known as the periphrastic perfect infinitive. The following examples illustrate a present unreal (contrary to fact) situation:

 (Cicero)
'they confess that they would not lift a hand for the sake of virtue, unless virtue itself gave pleasure'

 (Cicero)
'do you think any old woman would be so crazy as to believe in dreams if they didn't come true by chance sometimes?'

 (Pliny)
'what do we think would be happening to him if he were alive?' – 'he would be dining with us!'

As illustrated above, in an unreal conditional, the imperfect or pluperfect tense of the subjunctive in the protasis '(if' clause) remains unchanged, even after a primary tense verb.

Past unreal events and situations
Exactly the same construction with the future participle plus  can also refer to a past situation contrary to fact:

 (Quintilian)
'it is unlikely that he would have told a lie unless he had been desperate.'

 (Livy)
'but take this message to him, that I would have died better if I had not married on the day of my funeral!'

However, this is very rare, and only two instances have been noted:

 (Caesar)
'if at that very moment certain reports had not been brought of Caesar's victory, most people reckoned that the town would have been lost'

The perfect infinitive of  can also be used in the main clause of an unreal past conditional, that is, to write 'could have done' instead of 'would have done', since the two are close in meaning:

 (Caesar)
'but most people think that if he had been prepared to follow up the pursuit more vigorously, the war could have been finished on that day'

Indirect questions

Indirect questions in Latin use the subjunctive mood. Following the sequence of tenses rule, primary tenses (present, perfect, periphrastic future) are used when the context is primary, and historic tenses (imperfect, pluperfect, and imperfect periphrastic future) when the context is historic. Similar tenses are usually used after the phrase  'I do not doubt'. However, when the introductory verb is a historic present, or where there is no introductory verb, the writer has a choice, and can use either primary or historic sequence, or even a mixture of the two.

The periphrastic tenses with the future participle are used only in indirect questions and after  'I do not doubt that'. In other kinds of indirect sentences (e.g. after verbs of command or fearing) the present or imperfect subjunctive are used with a future meaning.

Contemporaneous situation
If the sentence is an indirect question referring to the same time as the main verb, the present subjunctive is normally used after a primary tense verb:

 (Cicero)
'they are asking me where the money is'

The present subjunctive after  would also normally refer to a current situation:

 (Cicero)
'I am sure you know what town I am from'

However, sometimes, the present subjunctive after  can refer to a future event (see examples below).

When the verb of speaking is in a historic tense, the imperfect subjunctive is used:

 (Cicero)
'he asked where the letter was from'

 (Curtius)
'nor did the Persians doubt that the Macedonians were fleeing.'

Deliberative subjunctive

A present or imperfect subjunctive can also represent a deliberative subjunctive ('what are we to do?') in direct speech:

 (Caesar)
'nor was it very clear what they ought to do'

Earlier event or situation
In indirect questions, after a primary tense verb, an event earlier than the verb of speaking is usually represented by the perfect subjunctive:

 (Cicero)
'you ask what military service he has seen.'

With the perfect subjunctive in indirect questions there is sometimes some ambiguity, since this tense can also represent an imperfect or pluperfect tense of direct speech:

 (Cicero)
'we do not yet know what the ambassadors have done' (or 'were doing', or 'did', or 'had done')

When the introductory verb is in a historic tense, the pluperfect subjunctive is used:

 (Cicero)
'yesterday I was wondering what had happened'

 (Cicero)
'we were sure that you had already reached Brundisium'

The pluperfect subjunctive can also be a reflection of an original imperfect tense. In the following example, according to Woodcock, the original verbs would have been  and :

 (Livy)
'[he said] that they begged just one favour, that they should be not assigned lower ranks than those which they had held when they were serving in the army'

 (Livy)
'whether this was noticed too late, or whether some trick was (already) suspected, is unknown'

 (Livy)
'whether they did this of their own accord or whether it was because they already had instructions to do so is not certain'

Later event or situation
In an indirect question referring to an event or situation later than the main verb, the future participle is combined with the present subjunctive of :
 (Cicero)
'it is uncertain what he is going to do'

 (Cicero)
'I am sure that I am going to like it' (viz. your play)

 (Cicero)
'I am sure that you will be granted your request.'

After a historic verb,  changes to the imperfect :

 (Cicero)
'he warned Crassus what would happen, if he wasn't careful'

 (Livy)
'some were standing still, uncertain whether it would be safer to go forward or to retreat into the camp'

However, after  sometimes the simple subjunctive alone can also have a future meaning, if the context makes it clear. This is in fact necessary if the verb is passive, since there is no passive future participle:

 (Cicero)
'I am sure that you will not commit yourself to sailing or travelling until you are completely better'

 (Ovid)<ref>Ovid, Heroides"" 17.245.</ref>
'nor do I doubt that if I follow you, arms will be prepared'

 (Cicero)
'I am sure I shall come to you immediately'

 (Caesar)
'they said that if these things were reported to Ariovistus, they did not doubt that he would punish them all'

Since in  there is no distinction between a future condition and an ideal one, the above sentence could also be interpreted as being an ideal conditional ('if Ariovistus were to hear of this, he would punish us all').

Future perfect situation

Almost no examples are given in grammar books of an indirect question expressing a future perfect situation using a subjunctive verb, apart from the following:

 (Cicero)
'nor do I doubt that by the time you read this letter, the matter will already have been settled'

As with the infinitive construction, there seems to be no way of expressing a future perfect situation when the verb is active.

Ideal potential situation

The distinction between the ideal conditional ('if this were to happen') and the simple future conditional ('if this happens') disappears in indirect speech). In an indirect question about a hypothetical unreal situation, the periphrastic present subjunctive is found, just as in a logical future conditional:

 (Cicero)
'we ourselves have never seen such a (perfectly wise) man; but it is explained in the opinions of philosophers what such a person would be like, if one were ever to exist'

Present unreal situations
If the sentence is an indirect question, according to Woodcock, the periphrastic perfect subjunctive can be used. The following example is quoted by Woodcock as describing a hypothetical present or future situation:
 (Seneca)
'think how much extra speed you would put on, if an enemy were pursuing you!'

However, the following statement based on an unreal present condition uses the simple imperfect subjunctive to refer to a hypothetical future situation:

 (Cicero)
'nor do I doubt that, if only the Senate still existed in the republic, one day a statue would be set up to this man in the forum.'

As illustrated above, in an unreal conditional, the imperfect or pluperfect tense of the subjunctive in the protasis '(if' clause) remains unchanged, even after a primary tense verb.

Past unreal events and situations

An indirect question about an unreal past situation has the future participle plus the perfect subjunctive of :

 (Livy)
'tell us, Appius Claudius, what you would have done if you had been censor at that time?'

After a historic introductory verb in an unreal conditional clause, the potential perfect subjunctive is usually still retained (contrary to the usual sequence of tenses rule):

 (Livy)

'nor was there any doubt that if it were possible for so few to manage everything at once, the enemy would have turned their backs'

Occasionally, however, the subjunctive becomes pluperfect, but this is rare, and found only in Livy:

 (Livy)
'it occurred to them how impossible Etruria would have been, if anything had gone wrong in Samnium'

'Could have done'
'Could have done' can be used instead of 'would have done', since the two are close in meaning. So in an indirect question it is possible to use the perfect subjunctive  with the present infinitive;

 (Cicero)
'you ask what more Plancius could/would have achieved, if he had been the son of Gnaeus Scipio'

The perfect subjunctive  is usually retained even in a historic context:

 (Livy)
'there was no doubt that if the delay had not intervened, the Carthaginian camp could/would have been captured on that day'

Present subjunctive in historic sequence

Just as in narrative, when writers often change from the perfect (or imperfect) to the historical present tense to make their writing more vivid, so in the same way the subjunctives in indirect speech sometimes use the two primary tenses (present and perfect) even when the context is past.

Usually if the introductory verb of indirect speech is in a primary tense, the subjunctive verbs are primary, while if it is historic, the subjunctive verbs are historic.

 (Caesar)
'he instructed that everyone was to attack Indutiomarus alone, and that no one is to wound anyone before he has seen Indutiomarus killed'

Commenting on this sentence, Postgate suggests that the change to primary tenses represents some 'sharpening of the emphasis'.

Andrewes (1937, 1951) points out that different authors have different practices in regard to the use of primary and historic tenses in indirect speech. Cicero generally follows the sequence of tenses, but this is not always true of Caesar. In some examples Caesar seems to use the present subjunctive to refer to a future time, and the imperfect to refer to the current situation.

 (Caesar)
'moreover, even if no one else were to follow him, he would go with the tenth legion alone, about whose loyalty he had no doubt.'

 (Caesar)
'(the ambassadors said that) the Helvetii were intending to make a journey through the province, because they had no other route; and that they were requesting that it might be allowed for them to do so with Caesar's permission'

In Livy and Tacitus, on the other hand, the tense of the reported verb tends to follow the tense of the indicative of direct speech; thus in the following example, a perfect indicative turns into a perfect subjunctive, and an imperfect indicative into an imperfect subjunctive:Postgate (1905), p. 442.

 (Livy)
'(he said that) he would have made an attack the previous day in the council, but the matter had been postponed, since the convenor of the council had been absent, whom in particular he had been aiming for.'

However, when the original verb in direct speech is subjunctive, these authors follow the sequence of tenses rule.

 (Tacitus)
'but now that he was not being induced by fear, he would go so that he could look at the situation and make a settlement.'

The use of primary and historic subjunctives in this example from Tacitus differs from the preceding examples from Caesar, since in Tacitus the present subjunctive refers to the current situation, and the imperfect to future time.

Indicative in subordinate clauses
 (Cicero)
'I hope that if (Catiline) is acquitted, he will work more closely with me in my election campaign'

 (Cicero)
'I'm afraid that once I see you I may forget everything'

The present indicative can also be retained after :
 (Cicero)
'tell them, stranger, at Sparta that you have seen us lying here while we obey the sacred laws of our country'

A relative clause which is merely explanatory also uses the indicative:
 (Cicero)
'who would deny that all these things which we see are ruled by the power of the immortal gods?'

The use of the indicative is more common after a primary tense introductory verb than a historic one, and also sometimes in cases where the use of the subjunctive might cause ambiguity.

Extended passages of indirect speech
Roman writers, especially historians, often use quite extensive passages of indirect speech. An example is the following, which is from a letter by an ex-consul Servius Sulpicius Rufus to Cicero:

 (Servius Sulpicius Rufus)

'Around the tenth hour of the night, Publius Postumius, a friend of his, came to me and reported to me that Marcus Marcellus, our colleague, after dinner time had been stabbed with a dagger by Publius Magius Cilo, a friend of his, and had received two wounds, one in the stomach and the other on the head, behind his ear; it was hoped, however, that he would be able to live; Magius had killed himself afterwards; he himself had been sent to me by Marcellus to report these things and to ask me to send some doctors for him.'

The whole passage above, which mainly consists of indirect statements, is dependent on the verb  'he reported'. That it is indirect is shown by the fact that most of the verbs have been changed to infinitives (shown in bold), while the subjects of the verbs  are put into the accusative case. The last clause, with its imperfect subjunctive ( 'that I should send'), is an indirect command.

Many passages of indirect speech are found in Julius Caesar's commentaries. The following is typical:

 (Caesar)

'To this embassy Ariovistus replied: if he himself had been in need of Caesar, he would have come to him; if Caesar were to require anything of him, he, Caesar, ought to come to him. Besides, he did not dare to come without an army into those parts of Gaul which Caesar possessed, nor was it possible for him to gather an army into one location without a large supply train and effort. Moreover, it seemed to him strange what business either Caesar or the Roman People as a whole had in his own part of Gaul, which he had conquered in war.'

The passage consists of five indirect statements with infinitive verbs (two of which,  'it is fitting' and  'it seems' are impersonal and have no subject), and an indirect question with the subjunctive. Interleaved with these are two conditional clauses and two relative clauses, all of which use the subjunctive mood.

Direct speech
In Latin historians,  is very common. In Caesar's commentaries, there are some 190 instances of indirect speech, but only 21 examples of direct speech. The direct speeches tend to be quite short, although there are some longer ones, such as Curio's speech to his troops before a battle. Quite often they mark dramatic moments, including several speeches made just before a battle, such as Caesar's own speech before the battle of Pharsalia, or the eagle-bearer's encouragement to his comrades before leaping into the sea when Caesar's invading force reached the coast of Britain. In some cases they are accompanied by phrases such as  'in a loud voice'. It is likely that during a public recitation of the work, such passages allowed the reciter to add extra drama to the recitation.

In Livy too, direct speech is found sparingly but at dramatic moments. These include the words of the Delphic oracle announcing the future ruler of Rome, the words of the heroines Lucretia and Sophoniba before they committed suicide, and the announcement to the people of the tragedy of Lake Trasimene.

Bibliography
Andrewes, M. (1937). "Caesar's Use of Tense Sequence in Indirect Speech". The Classical Review, Vol. 51, No. 4 (September 1937), pp. 114–116.
Andrewes, M. (1951). "The Function of Tense Variation in the Subjunctive Mood of Oratio Obliqua". The Classical Review, New Series, Vol. 1, No. 3/4 (December 1951), pp. 142–146.
Gildersleeve, B. L. & Gonzalez Lodge (1895). Gildersleeve's Latin Grammar. 3rd Edition. (Macmillan)
Goodrich, W. J. "On the Prospective Use of the Latin Imperfect Subjunctive in Relative Clauses". The Classical Review, Vol. 31, No. 3/4 (May – June 1917), pp. 83–86.
Greenough, J. B. et al. (1903). Allen and Greenough's New Latin Grammar for Schools and Colleges. Boston and London.
Ker, James (2007). "Roman Repraesentatio". American Journal of Philology, Vol. 128, No. 3 (Autumn, 2007), pp. 341–365.
Nordling, John G. (2006). "Caesar's Pre-Battle Speech at Pharsalus (B.C. 3.85.4): Ridiculum Acri Fortius ... Secat Res" The Classical Journal, Vol. 101, No. 2 (December – January 2005/2006), pp. 183–189.
Pinkster, Harm (1990), Latin Syntax and Semantics, especially ch. 7.
Postgate, J. P. (1905). "Repraesentatio Temporum in the Oratio Obliqua of Caesar". The Classical Review, Vol. 19, No. 9 (December 1905), pp. 441–446.
Salmon, E. T. (1931). "A Note on Subordinate Clauses in Oratio Obliqua". The Classical Review, Vol. 45, No. 5 (November 1931), p. 173.
Terrell, Glanville (1904). "The Apodosis of the Unreal Condition in Oratio Obliqua in Latin". American Journal of Philology, Vol. 25, No. 1 (1904), pp. 59–73.
Viti, Carlotta (2010). "The non-literal use of tenses in Latin, with particular reference to the praesens historicum". Revue de linguistique latine du Centre Alfred Ernout. (Posted at Zurich Open Repository and Archive, University of Zurich).
Woodcock, E.C. (1959), A New Latin Syntax''.

References

External links
University of Chicago Perseus under PhiloLogic searchable corpus. Perseus under PhiloLogic home page
Online version of Allen & Greenough's Latin Grammar
Online version of Gildersleeve & Lodge's Latin Grammar

Latin grammar
Syntax